The Derbyshire Women's cricket team is the women's representative cricket team for the English historic county of Derbyshire. They play their home games at various grounds across the county, and are captained by Lauren Tuffrey. In 2019, they competed in Division 3 of the final season of the Women's County Championship, and have since competed in the Women's Twenty20 Cup. They are partnered with the regional side Lightning.

History

Women's County Championship
Derbyshire Women joined the Women's County Championship for its inaugural season in 1997, in which they won Division 3 and were promoted. They played in Division 2 for two seasons, before being relegated in 1999; however, they bounced straight back and were promoted the following season, winning five out of five games. After being relegated again in 2002, Derbyshire ended up in the County Challenge Cup in 2004, the competition a tier below the County Championship. Derbyshire performed well here, just missing out on promotion in 2005 and 2006 before finally achieving it in 2007. Over the next 10 years, Derbyshire remained in the lowest division of the County Championship, before being promoted in 2016 to Division Two, finishing just three points ahead of Durham. They were relegated two seasons later, in 2018, before finishing 2nd in Division 3A in the final season of the Championship, 2019.

Women's Twenty20 Cup
Derbyshire also played in the inaugural season of the Women's Twenty20 Cup, 2009, finishing bottom of Division 3. Similarly to their Championship performance, Derbyshire consistently bounced between the divisions, for example being promoted in 2014, 2016 and 2018 and being relegated in 2015 and 2017. In 2021, they competed in the East Midlands Group of the Twenty20 Cup, and finished 4th with 2 victories. In 2022, they finished 3rd in Group 1 of the Twenty20 Cup.

Players

Current squad
Based on appearances in the 2022 season. denotes players with international caps.

Notable players
Players who have played for Derbyshire and played internationally are listed below, in order of first international appearance (given in brackets):

 Wendy Watson (1987)
 Sue Redfern (1995)
 Kathryn Bryce (2018)
 Sarah Glenn (2019)

Seasons

Women's County Championship

Women's Twenty20 Cup

See also
 Derbyshire County Cricket Club
 Lightning (women's cricket)

References

Cricket in Derbyshire
Women's cricket teams in England